Fernando Gómez Herrera (born 26 February 1984), commonly known as Nando, is a Spanish footballer who plays for Atlético Mancha Real as a left back.

Club career
Born in Mancha Real, Province of Jaén, Nando made his senior debuts with local Atlético Mancha Real in the 2003–04 season. In 2006, he first arrived in the Segunda División B, signing for CD Alcalá.

Nando alternated between the third level and the Tercera División in the following years, with UD Marbella, Atlético Mancha Real (playing one season in the fifth level) and Real Jaén. He achieved promotion at the end of the 2012–13 campaign with the latter, appearing in 28 matches.

On 25 August 2013 Nando made his debut as a professional, being sent off in a 2–4 away defeat against CD Numancia in the Segunda División.

References

External links

1984 births
Living people
Spanish footballers
Footballers from Andalusia
Association football defenders
Segunda División players
Segunda División B players
Tercera División players
Marbella FC players
Real Jaén footballers